Mohan Rakesh (मोहन राकेश; 8 January 19253 December 1972) was one of the pioneers of the Nai Kahani ("New Story") literary movement of the Hindi literature in India in the 1950s. He wrote the first modern Hindi play, Ashadh Ka Ek Din (One Day in Aashad) (1958), which won a competition organised by the Sangeet Natak Akademi. He made significant contributions to the novel, the short story, travelogue, criticism, memoir and drama.

He was awarded the Sangeet Natak Akademi Award in 1968.

Early life and education

He was born as Madan Mohan Guglani on 8 January 1925 in Amritsar in the Punjab Province of British India. His father was a lawyer who died when he was sixteen. Mohan Rakesh hailed from a Sindhi family. His father migrated from Sindh to Punjab long ago. He did his M.A. in English and Hindi from Punjab University, Lahore.

Career
He started his career as a postman at Dehradun from 1947 to 1949, after that he shifted to Delhi, but found a teaching job in Jalandhar, Punjab for a short while. Subsequently, he remained Head of the Hindi department at DAV College, Jalandhar (Guru Nanak Dev University) and taught Hindi at Bishop Cotton School in Shimla for two years before coming back to teaching Jalandhar. In Shimla, he had Ruskin Owen Bond among his students. Eventually, he resigned from his job in 1957 to write full-time. He also briefly edited Hindi literary journal Sarika, from 1962 to 1963. 

His novels are Andhere Band Kamare (Closed Dark Rooms) and Na Aane Wala Kal (The Tomorrow That Never Comes). His plays include Ashadh Ka Ek Din (One Day in Aashad) (1958), played a major role in reviving Hindi theatre in the 1960s and Adhe Adhure (The Incomplete Ones or Halfway ouse) (1969). His debut play Ashadh Ka Ek Din was first performed by Kolkata-based Hindi theatre group Anamika, under director Shyamanand Jalan (1960) and subsequently by Ebrahim Alkazi at National School of Drama Delhi in 1962, which established Mohan Rakesh as the first modern Hindi playwright. His plays continue to be performed and receive acclaim worldwide. One Day in the Season of Rain, Aparna Dharwadker and Vinay Dharwadker's authorised English translation of Ashadh Ka Ek Din, premiered at Carthage College in Kenosha, Wisconsin, United States in 2010 and traveled to the Kennedy Center American College Theatre Festival (Region 3) in 2011.

Lahron Ke Rajhans (The Swans of the Waves), a play of Mohan Rakesh about an ancient Buddhist tale on the renunciation of the Buddha, and its aftereffects on his close family, was first written as a short story and later turned into a radio play for All India Radio Jalandhar, and broadcast under the title Sundri, though his struggle over different versions of the play lasted for nearly 20 years. Prominent Indian directors Om Shivpuri, Shyamanand Jalan, Arvind Gaur and Ram Gopal Bajaj directed this play. In 2005, this very writing process of the play, and Mohan Rakesh's diary, writings, and letters about the play, were recreated in a play titled Manuscript, by a Delhi theatre group.

In July 1971, he received the Jawarharlal Nehru Fellowship for research on 'The Dramatic Word'. However, he could not complete it and died on 3 January 1972.

Personal life
His second marriage in 1960 too ended soon. However, in his third marriage to Anita Aulakh in 1963, he had found love. At the time of the marriage Anita was 21 year old. After his death, she continued to live in Delhi and, now in her seventies, lives in East of Kailash neighbourhood. Her autobiographical work, Satrein Aur Satrein, was first serialized in the Hindi magazine Sarika, and later published in 2002.

Literary work

Novels (Upanyas)

 Andhere Band Kamre (1961)
 Na Aanewala Kal (1968)
 Antaraal (1972)
 Bakalama Khuda (1974)

Plays (Natak-Ekanki)

 Aadhe Adhure / आधे अधूरे (1969) 
 
 Lahron Ke Rajhans / लहरों के राजहंस (1963) 
 Ashadh Ka Ek Din / आषाढ़ का एक दिन (One Day in Ashadha, 1958) 
 Mohan Rakesh ke Sampurn Natak, 1993, Rajpal. .
]

History

Posthumously published 

 Pairon Tale Ki Zameen (1973)
(Left incomplete, later completed by Kamleshwar)
 Ande Ke Chilke, anya ekanki tatha beej natak (1973)
 Rata Bitane Taka Tatha Anya Dhvani Nataka, 1974, Radhakrishna Prakashan. . (Radio plays)

Translation
 Mrichchkatikam, (Sanskrit play)
 Shakuntalam (Sanskrit play)

Story anthologies (Kahani Sangrah)
 10 Pratinidhi Kahaniyan (Mohan Rakesh)
 Rat ki Bahon Mein
 Mohan Rakesh ki meri prem Kahaniyan

Kannada translations

Plays 

 Aashadada Ondu Dina by Siddhaling Pattanshetti (1973, 1978, 1979, 1988, 1993, 2000, 2011, 2012, 2017) (Ashadh Ka Ek Din / आषाढ़ का एक दिन (One Day in Ashadha, 1958))
 Alalegalalli Rajahamsagalu by Siddhaling Pattanshetti (1980, 1988, 2017) (Lahron Ke Rajhans / लहरों के राजहंस (1963))
 Aadha Adhure by Siddhaling Pattanshetti (1976, 1989) (Aadhe Adhure / आधे अधूरे (1969))
 Kaala Kelagina Nela by Siddhaling Pattanshetti (2011) (Pairon Tale Ki Zameen (1973))

Cinematic adaptations 
Two of his literary works were adapted by the filmmaker Mani Kaul. The first film was Uski Roti made in 1969 based on the short story of the same name. For this film, Mohan Rakesh wrote the dialogs. The second film was Ashadh Ka Ek Din made in 1971, based on a play by Mohan Rakesh.

References

Further reading 
 Aadhunik Hindi Natak Ka Agradoot: Mohan Rakesh
 Mohan Rakesh’s Halfway House: Critical Perspectives, edited by Subhash Chandra. New Delhi, Asia Book, 2001, . (Aadhe Adhure)
 Miss Pal by Mohan Rakesh

External links 
 Mohan Rakesh in Abhivyakti

1925 births
1972 deaths
Sindhi people
Indian people of Sindhi descent
Hindi-language writers
Indian male novelists
Indian male essayists
Indian male dramatists and playwrights
20th-century Indian translators
Recipients of the Sangeet Natak Akademi Award
University of the Punjab alumni
Hindi dramatists and playwrights
20th-century Indian novelists
20th-century Indian essayists
Academic staff of the University of Mumbai
Jawaharlal Nehru Fellows
20th-century Indian dramatists and playwrights
Writers from Amritsar
Novelists from Punjab, India
Dramatists and playwrights from Punjab, India